Ulsan Castle (울산왜성), also known as is a Japanese style castle in Ulsan, South Korea which was constructed during the Japanese invasions of Korea (Imjin war) by Katō Kiyomasa's army. Today, Ulsan Castle is almost ruined by the city planning of Ulsan.

Ulsan Japanese Castle was excluded from Historic Sites of South Korea on October 30, 1997.

Characteristics 
Yagura (Guard Tower): 12.
Moats, Gates and other structures
Date of Construction: November, 1597 (established)
Founder: Katō Kiyomasa
Status: The 7th Ulsan monument
Location: Hakseong-dong, Jung-ju, Ulsan

See also 
Siege of Ulsan
Japanese castles in Korea
Suncheon Castle

External links 
Korean National Federation of UNESCO ULSAN Clubs and associations, a reconstituted picture of Ulsan Waesung
Map of Ulsan Japanese Castle from the Korean National Federation of UNESCO ULSAN Clubs and associations
Ulsan Japanese Castle under Chinese-Korean allied troops attack 
Map of Ulsan Japanese Castle

History of Ulsan
Buildings and structures in Ulsan
Japanese-style castles in Korea
Japanese invasions of Korea (1592–1598)
Castles in South Korea